Nakop is a small town and border post in northwestern South Africa on its border with Namibia. It lies ten kilometres north of the Orange River. In August 1914, the town was the site of the first conflict between German and South African troops in World War I over control of German South West Africa.

References

Namibia–South Africa border crossings
Populated places in the Kai !Garib Local Municipality